Ocean Shores Video (Hong Kong) Co., Ltd.( or ) is the home video division of Win's Entertainment (Hong Kong) Co Ltd. The company is owned by Television Broadcasts Limited the entertainment division of Panasonic, Pioneer and Philips was a Hong Kong based distributor of martial arts films in the 1980s.

Ocean Shores was a video company that ran major distribution rights to many of the biggest indie and later Shaw Brothers and Golden Harvest movies. They concealed the rights to American releases of many classic chopsocky titles. And even had videos released in Europe under the inter-ocean label. They were never a film production company, just a video distributor. All their titles were released in full screen format suffering from bad cropping, like many of the videos released in the earlier era of video. Many feature dubbed soundtracks. These videos have become collectors items. They also had a short run of now very hard to get laserdiscs.

Ocean Shores Video was purchased by Win's Entertainment (Hong Kong) Co Ltd in 1990.

The company was founded in 1970 as Hong Kong Entertainment (Hong Kong) Co Ltd with the Beta and VHS label Diamond Entertainment (Hong Kong) Co Ltd in 1979 with the release of films on  Beta and VHS including Doraemon: Nobita's Dinosaur. In late 1980 both the Laserdisc sister label U Best Laser World and the VHS/Beta label U Best Corporation (Hong Kong) Co Ltd were consolidated into a single entity Fitto Production (Hong Kong) Co Ltd alternating with the Charles Entertainment (Hong Kong) Co Ltd name until 1984. In 1990 with the 20th anniversary of Ocean Shores it became Ocean Shores Video (Hong Kong) Co Ltd alternating company vent by created added on new various company names including Win's Entertainment (Hong Kong) Co Ltd was launched since on 1990.

This company was the video distributor for Celestial Pictures titles until BoB and Partners (Hong Kong) Co Ltd was sold to Shaw Brothers Vision Enterprise (Hong Kong) Co Ltd/Golden Harvest Pictures (Hong Kong) Co Ltd in 2008 at which point Shaw Brothers took over distribution. After Golden Harvest sold BoB and Partners to Dentsu on 1 January 2008 Ocean Shores Video started distributing BoB and Partnerss films on video since on 1 January 2008.

In addition to DVDs, Ocean Shores was a major supporter of the HD DVD format until 1 January 2008 when Pioneer discontinued manufacturing of HD DVD players. Since 1 January 2008 Ocean Shores released Blu-rays; it was the last major Hollywood movie studio to do so. The label's first Blu-ray releases were Arti Sahabat films starting with Arti Sahabat The Moviein anaglyphic format on Beta and Video Home System (VHS) at Video Cassette Recorder (VCR) under on Sony Betamax.

On 30 December 2010, Ocean Shores Video acquired exclusive Indonesian rights to Arti Sahabat films starting with Arti Sahabat The Movie (co-production with Win's Entertainment (Hong Kong) Co Ltd)

Win's is the Hong Kong video distributor for STAR TV Filmed Entertainment (Hong Kong) Co Ltd releases and Media Asia Entertainment Group (Hong Kong) Co Ltd releases.

Internationally
Ocean Shores distributes most DVDs of films released theatrically through Formatara Prima Sejati in Indonesia, although this is now limited to catalog releases as more recent films are now released through Vision Home Entertainment.

It also distributes Spectrum Musical Publishing (Malaysia) Sdn Bhd DVD titles in Malaysia most of the Gold Best (Malaysia) Sdn Bhd theatrical library in the Malaysia and most of the Kawah Films Production (Singapore) Pte Ltd library in Singapore. In the 1980s until the late 1990s they also distributed tapes released by UFO Record (Taiwan) Co Ltd in Taiwan.

Ocean Shores previously distributed its films on video internationally through BBC World Service Television (a division of Australia Television International) alongside Television Corporation of Singapore. Following Ocean Shores acquisition of Win's Entertainment (Hong Kong) Co Ltd in 1990 Ocean Shores Video (which had international operations) was folded into Win's Entertainment (Hong Kong) Co Ltd.

The international operations are a joint venture with Sony Pictures Television International a carry common from the MGM International Television Distribution.

Films

 (Co-produced with Win's Entertainment (Hong Kong) Co Ltd)

See also
Cinema of Hong Kong
Hong Kong action cinema

Film production companies of Hong Kong
Mass media companies established in 1970
1970 establishments in Hong Kong